NGC 925 Amatha Galaxy is a barred spiral galaxy located about 30 million light-years away in the constellation Triangulum. The morphological classification of this galaxy is SB(s)d, indicating that it has a bar structure and loosely wound spiral arms with no ring. The spiral arm to the south is stronger than the northern arm, with the latter appearing flocculent and less coherent. The bar is offset from the center of the galaxy and is the site of star formation all along its length. Both of these morphological traits—a dominant spiral arm and the offset bar—are typically characteristics of a Magellanic spiral galaxy. The galaxy is inclined at an angle of 55° to the line of sight along a position angle of 102°.

The Amatha galaxy is a member of the NGC 1023 Group, a nearby, gravitationally-bound group of galaxies associated with NGC 1023. However, the nearest member lies at least  distant from NGC 925. There is a 10 million solar mass cloud of neutral hydrogen attached to NGC 925 by a streamer. It is uncertain whether this is a satellite dwarf galaxy, the remnant of a past tidal interaction, or a cloud of primordial gas.

References

External links 
 

Barred spiral galaxies
Triangulum (constellation)
0925
01913
009332
NGC 1023 Group